The 373rd Fighter Group is an inactive United States Army Air Force unit. Its last assignment was with First Air Force stationed at Mitchel Field, New York. It was inactivated on 7 November 1945.

During World War II the group was assigned to Ninth Air Force in Western Europe. It was awarded a Distinguished Unit Citation for a mission on 20 March 1945, that greatly facilitated the crossing of the Rhine River by Allied ground forces: without losing any planes, the group repeatedly dived through barrages of antiaircraft fire to bomb vital airfields east of the river; also attacked rail lines and highways leading to the Rhine, hitting rolling stock, motor transports, and other objectives.

The 373rd was redesignated as the 146th Fighter Group, and allotted to the California Air National Guard on 24 May 1946.

History
During World War II the 373rd Fighter Group participated in the aerial operations which made possible the establishment of the Normandy beachhead and the rapid advance of the Allied ground forces into Germany. Although in combat only 12 months, the Group took part in six campaigns and was awarded one Distinguished Unit Citation for outstanding performance of duty in action.

The unit was constituted as the 373rd Fighter Group on 25 May 1943. The unit, consisting of the 410th, 411th, and 412th Fighter Squadrons, was activated at Westover Field, Massachusetts, on 15 August 1943. The original personnel for the 373rd were supplied by the 326th Fighter Group. Training for the 373rd Fighter Group began at Westover Field in September 1943 and was continued at Norfolk Army Airfield, Virginia, where the unit moved on 22 October.

On 12 February 1944 the group's training was brought to a halt and the organization prepared for its departure overseas. The group moved to Camp Shanks, New York, on 15 March. One week later the unit's personnel moved to the New York Port of Embarkation, boarded HMS Duchess of Bedford, and on the following day sailed for Great Britain. The ship reached Greenock, Scotland, on 3 April, and the men disembarked and moved to their new station at RAF Woodchurch, Kent, England. During the remainder of the month the group prepared for combat operations by flying training missions. Some of the pilots, in order to gain experience, participated in missions with the 358th Fighter Group.

The 373rd Fighter Group flew its first combat mission—a fighter sweep over the coast of France—on 8 May 1944. No aerial opposition or flak was encountered. All planes returned safely to their base. Three days later the unit escorted a group of Martin B-26 Marauder bombers to France. Then, on 21 May, the unit participated in its first strike into Germany, when 50 of its Republic P-47 Thunderbolts conducted a fighter sweep over the lower Ruhr Valley.

The unit met its first enemy air opposition on the mission of 24 May, when it was attacked by seven Focke-Wulf Fw 190s while escorting bombers to Belgium. Three days later the group completed its first dive-bombing mission—a strike against a railway bridge in the vicinity of Rouen. During another strike on that same target later in the day, the unit's pilots scored three direct hits.

The mission accomplished by the 373rd Fighter Group in May 1944 prepared the unit for the tremendous tasks it was to undertake during the month of June. In all, the 373rd completed 54 missions, consisting of 1,532 sorties, during the month. Fourteen of its missions were flown on D-Day (6 June), when it patrolled the beaches and provided top cover for other outfits in dive-bombing attacks against enemy targets.

In the days succeeding the successful establishment of the Normandy beachhead the 373rd Group swept behind enemy lines, attacking motor convoys, troops, transportation facilities, and other tactical and interdictory targets, in an effort to isolate the battlefield. Often the pilots directed their strikes against any target of opportunity which would hamper the movement of enemy supplies, hinder communications, and check the flow of German reinforcements to the front.

On 25 June, the 411th Squadron became the first component of the 373rd Fighter Group to land in France. On that day the squadron was sent out to patrol the area between Le Havre and Cap de Barfleur. When their fuel supply was nearly exhausted the squadron's P-47s were relieved by aircraft from one of the other squadrons, and the pilots landed Azeville Airfield (A-7) on the Cotentin Peninsula. At that landing strip the planes were refueled and the pilots took off to patrol the same area. Later they returned to their base at Woodchurch.

Although the 373rd Group was primarily concerned with ground support and interdiction operations, it did, on several occasions, engage the enemy in aerial combat. For example, on 7 June, one day after the landings, the 410th Fighter Squadron accounted for three aerial victories.  On 29 June, while the 411th Fighter Squadron was providing top cover for a dive-bombing strike against rolling stock in the Le Mans-Tours area, its pilots ran into seven Messerschmitt Bf 109s. In the battle which ensued the 411th's pilots chalked up five aerial victories.

The movement of the 373rd Fighter Group to France in July 1944 hindered its operations during the latter part of the month; however, in August the Group's operations were once again in high gear. With reduced flying distance to and from the front lines the unit was able to complete 94 missions during the month. Most of those missions were in support of General George Patton's United States Third Army, which during the month burst out of Normandy and into Brittany, liberated all of that peninsula except three port cities, and swept  past Paris to within  of the German border.

During that rapid advance across France the 373rd Fighter Group and other XIX Tactical Air Command units blazed the way for General Patton's tank columns. The 373rd, along with the other units, provided "umbrella cover" for the advancing ground forces, knocked out enemy rail and railroad transportation, and struck again and again at enemy tanks, gun emplacements, troop concentrations, and strongpoints.

Late in August and early in September the 373rd Fighter Group devoted much of its attention to blasting the German fortifications at Brest. After the Third Army burst out of Normandy at Avranches on 1 August and began its rapid advance to the east, the first real stumbling block was met at Brest. The old fortifications of that city had been reinforced by the Germans and presented a barrier to American troops. In spite of repeated air attacks and shelling by 31 artillery battalions, the enemy still held on to its position.

Early in September the Ninth Air Force made the city its primary objective. In addition to continuing its air attacks with bombardment aircraft, the Ninth Air Force directed eight fighter groups, (one of which was the 373rd), consisting of approximately 400 planes, to provide air cooperation for the troops assaulting the city. Continuous dive-bombing and strafing attacks by the 373rd Fighter Group and its sister organizations finally forced the enemy to withdraw into the city itself. In the final phase of the assault the 373rd attacked enemy strongpoints which were obstructing the progress of our ground troops.

After 12 September the 373rd Fighter Group returned to supporting the front line elements of General Patton's Third Army. Despite the fact that the unit's base was far from the front lines, it completed 67 dive-bombing and reconnaissance missions—some of them to targets as far away as Luxembourg and Saarbrücken.

On 1 October 1944 the 373rd Fighter Group was transferred from the XIX Tactical Air Command to the newly formed XXIX Tactical Air Command. Thereafter the 373rd sought to isolate the front line battle areas by cutting rails and by destroying bridges and other transportation targets; and it gave direct ground support to elements of the Ninth Army by hitting enemy strongpoints, tanks, and gun positions.

Late in October the Group moved to Le Culot Airfield (A-68), Belgium, where it was located when, on 16 December, the Germans began their historic breakthrough which resulted in the Battle of the Bulge. From 19 to 23 December, while the Germans smashed Allied positions, Allied airpower lay helpless, bound down by unfavorable weather conditions which helped to shield the German thrust. Then, on 24 December the weather cleared and the 373rd Group and other air units flew attack after attack in support of our beleaguered ground forces through the remainder of December and during the entire month of January 1945. The German thrust was checked, and the enemy was slowly pushed back. So effective were the Allied aerial blows that by 1 February our ground forces had regained the positions held prior to 16 December.

Throughout that entire battle the 373rd Group played a small but significant role. Despite snow, fog, freezing rain, and cold weather, the group flew 13 missions during the month of January. Typical of the results attained in the missions were those of 1 January. On that day the unit destroyed 18 vehicles, 27 buildings, 15 railroad cars, and 4 tanks, and effected 19 road and railroad cuts.

In February 1945 the Germans, with their attempted breakthrough thwarted, were retreating rapidly. To cut off that retreat and to prevent the Germans from forming a line of defense, the 373rd Fighter Group and other XXIX Tactical Air Command units made repeated attacks against the enemy's retreating columns and against transportation targets behind enemy lines. During the month the group destroyed a total of 605 buildings, 412 railroad cars, 12 locomotives, 88 motor vehicles, and 2 tanks. The unit also effected 193 railroad and road cuts. and it blasted bridges, supply dumps. ammunition stores, gun positions, and pockets of resistance. Operations of that type continued until the war came to an end early in May 1945. On 20 March 1945, when the group's pilots destroyed or damaged 119 enemy aircraft on the ground.

The 373rd was awarded a Presidential Unit Citation. It reads: "For outstanding and heroic performance of duty in action against the enemy in the European Theater of Operations on 20 March 1945, this organization, displaying great valor and exemplary devotion to duty, greatly facilitated the crossing of the Rhine River by Allied Ground Forces by dealing six consecutive blows against the enemy's air potential and by crushing his lines of communication. The group destroyed and damaged one hundred nineteen enemy aircraft on three vital airfields which presented the greatest threat to Allied armies massed west of the Rhine, and rendered these airfields completely inoperative. With unswerving resolution, pilots dived repeatedly through the barrages of anti-aircraft to batter strategic targets, then, with brilliant airmanship and superior flying skill, returned all aircraft safely to base. In a further display of outstanding aerial tactics, the 373rd Fighter Group tenaciously and aggressively attacked rolling stock, motor transportation, and utterly disrupted main highways and rail lines leading to the Rhine. The ingenuity, efficiency, and cooperation on the part of all personnel contributed in the fullest measure to the devastation wreaked by the 373rd Fighter Group on this significant day. The outstanding performance, achieved through the superb esprit de corps of this unit, is in keeping with the highest traditions of the Army Air Forces.”

When the war ended the 373rd Fighter Group was stationed at Lippstadt, Germany. Later in the month the unit moved to Illesheim. Germany, where it remained until some time in July. The group then moved back to England, where on 25 July it boarded  and sailed for the United States.

After arriving at the Hampton Roads Port of Embarkation on 1 August, the Group moved to Camp Patrick Henry, Virginia. On the following day the 373rd was transferred to Sioux Falls Army Air Field. South Dakota. The group's stay at that base was short, for on 17 August it moved to Seymour-Johnson Field, North Carolina, and then to Mitchel Field, New York, on 28 September. Less than two months later, on 7 November 1945, the 373rd Fighter Group was inactivated.

The group emblem was an "unofficial" type but was carried on some P-47s of the unit, also the squadrons had "Unofficial" emblems as well.  The World War II-era emblem was a shield with a checkered upper right portion and a bar dividing the shield from top left to lower right and a solid color in the lower left portion.

Lineage
 Constituted as 373rd Fighter Group on 25 May 1943
 Activated on 15 August 1943
 Inactivated on 7 November 1945

Assignments
 I Fighter Command, 15 August 1943 – 15 March 1944
 Attached to: New York Fighter Wing, 23 October 1943 – 15 March 1944
 303d Fighter Wing
 Attached to: XIX Tactical Air Command, 4 April 1944
 Second Air Force, 4 August 1945
 First Air Force, 20 August – 7 November 1945

Stations

 Westover Field, Massachusetts, 15 August 1943
 Norfolk Airport, Virginia, 23 October 1943
 Richmond Army Air Base, Virginia, 15 February – 15 March 1944
 RAF Woodchurch (AAF-419), England, 4 April – 4 July 1944
 Tour-en-Bessin Airfield (A-13), France, 19 July 1944
 Saint James Airfield (A-29), France, 19 August 1944
 Reims/Champagne Airfield (A-62), France, 19 September 1944

 Le Culot Airfield (A-89), Belgium, 22 October 1944
 Venlo Airfield (Y-55), Netherlands, 11 March 1945
 Lippstadt Airfield (Y-98), Germany, 20 April 1945
 AAF Station Illesheim, Germany, 20 May–July 1945
 Sioux Falls Army Air Field, South Dakota, 4 August 1945
 Seymour Johnson Field, North Carolina, 20 August 1945
 Mitchel Field, New York, 28 September – 7 November 1945

Components
 410th Fighter Squadron, 15 August 1943 – 7 November 1945
 411th Fighter Squadron, 15 August 1943 – 7 November 1945
 412th Fighter Squadron, 15 August 1943 – 7 November 1945

Aircraft
 P-47 Thunderbolt, 1943–1945

References

 Maurer, Maurer (1983). Air Force Combat Units of World War II. Maxwell AFB, Alabama: Office of Air Force History. .
 Johnson, David C. (1988), U.S. Army Air Forces Continental Airfields (ETO), D-Day to V-E Day; Research Division, USAF Historical Research Center, Maxwell AFB, Alabama.

External links

Fighter groups of the United States Army Air Forces
Military units and formations established in 1943